Xavier Jones (born August 24, 1997) is an American football running back who is a free agent. He played college football at SMU and signed with the Rams as an undrafted free agent in 2020.

College career
Jones played college football at Southern Methodist University (SMU). He rushed for 3,434 yards and 45 touchdowns during his career.

Professional career
Jones signed with the Rams as an undrafted free agent on May 4, 2020. He played in 13 games primarily on special teams as a rookie.

On August 31, 2021, Jones was waived/injured by the Rams and placed on injured reserve. Jones became a Super Bowl champion when the Rams defeated the Cincinnati Bengals in Super Bowl LVI. On July 29, 2022, Jones was waived/injured by the Rams and placed on injured reserve. He was waived off injured reserve on September 6, 2022.

References

External links
SMU Mustangs bio

American football running backs
SMU Mustangs football players
Sportspeople from Harris County, Texas
Los Angeles Rams players
People from Spring, Texas
Players of American football from Texas
1997 births
Living people